Arulnithi Tamilarasu (born 21 July 1987) is an Indian actor best known for playing the lead role in Vamsam, directed by Pandiraj.

Personal life
Arulnithi's grandfather is M. Karunanidhi, former Chief Minister of Tamil Nadu. His father is M. K. Tamilarasu, brother of M. K. Stalin,Chief Minister of Tamil Nadu. His cousins include noted producers, Udhayanidhi Stalin and Dhayanidhi Alagiri.

Arulnithi was educated at St. Michael's Academy in Chennai, before pursuing a degree at Loyola College. He then went on to Pondicherry University to undertake more qualifications. Arulnithi married Keerthana on 7 June 2015. Their first child was born in 2017, a son named Magizhan. Their second child, a baby girl, was born in November 2021.

Acting career
Arulnithi was offered the lead role in Pandiraj's Vamsam after his cousin, Udhayanidhi Stalin, had opted out. The film featured him as a young man shying away from the politics of his village, despite claims for him to avenge his father's death. The film, which featured him alongside Sunaina, was heavily promoted in Tamil Nadu, and became a profitable venture at the box-office, garnering positive reviews. His second film was  Udhayan in which he played a dual role for the first time. The next film Mouna Guru directed by debutant Santhakumar was a critically acclaimed sleeper hit which was also screened at the Hong Kong International Film Festival 2013.

In 2013, he starred in action drama film Thagaraaru was released to average reviews. In 2014, his film Oru Kanniyum Moonu Kalavaanikalum is Chimbu Deven’s trademark style, filled with quirky characters, fantastical elements, and loads of comedy and satire. In 2015, his horror film Demonte Colony, directed by R. Ajay Gnanamuthu, is inspired by real life events centred around a supposedly haunted colony in Chennai called De Monte Colony. Arulnithi gives a good performance and the film is undoubtedly a fine attempt by the debutant director. Thereafter, the comedy Naalu Policeum Nalla Irundha Oorum (2015) which was posted on negative reviews. His next film was the crime thriller Aarathu Sinam (2016), which marks the arrival of a remake of yet another brilliant Malayalam film, Jeethu Joseph's Memories that had Prithviraj playing the lead. In Radha Mohan's Brindhavanam (2017), Arulnithi plays a deaf and mute character and his relationship with actor Vivek. Arulnithi's choice of screenplays has always been promising, giving importance to the content, and his next film was Iravukku Aayiram Kangal (2018). Arulnithi fits well into his character and shows maturity with his performance. It was released to positive reviews. In 2019, the thriller K-13  is another quality film from Arulnithi who has an eye for good scripts. Arulnithi has once again delivered a subtle performance.

His next movie was the multistarrer drama Kalathil Santhippom (2021) starring with Jiiva. It is directed by N Rajasekhar and produced by R. B. Choudary under the banner Super Good Films. In 2022, his thriller films have appeared with D Block, Dejavu and Diary.

Filmography

References

1987 births
21st-century Indian male actors
Male actors in Tamil cinema
Living people
Karunanidhi family
Male actors from Chennai